Parliamentary elections were held in Finland on 14 April 2019. For the first time, no party received more than 20% of the vote. The Centre Party, which had been the largest party following the 2015 elections, dropped to fourth place, losing 18 seats and recording its lowest vote share since 1917. The Social Democratic Party saw the biggest gains, winning six more seats and narrowly becoming the largest party for the first time since 1999. The Green League and the Left Alliance also gained five and four seats respectively.

The Finns Party and the National Coalition Party gained one seat each, with the Finns Party recovering the seats it had lost in the previous parliament when 21 of its MPs left to form Blue Reform, which failed to win a seat. The Swedish People's Party and the Christian Democrats retained all of their seats that they had won in the previous elections. The Åland Coalition retained their seat in Åland, whilst Harry Harkimo, a former National Coalition MP who founded Movement Now twelve months earlier, was reelected in his constituency, thus giving his own movement its first elected MP.

Social Democratic Party leader Antti Rinne subsequently formed a coalition government with the Centre Party, Green League, Left Alliance and Swedish People's Party. Due to the Centre Party's devastating defeat, Prime Minister Juha Sipilä consequently announced that he would continue as the chairman only until the party's next convention in September 2019.

Background
The incumbent government was formed by a three party center-right coalition, composed of the Centre Party, Finns Party and National Coalition Party. On 28 May 2015, the parliament elected Juha Sipilä as prime minister by a vote of 128–62.

2017 government crisis

On 10 June 2017, the Finns Party elected Jussi Halla-aho as the new leader of the party, after the long-time leader Timo Soini had decided to step down. Following the talks among the three coalition leaders, Sipilä and Minister of Finance Petteri Orpo announced that they would no longer cooperate in a coalition government with the Finns Party. The collapse of government was averted on 13 June when twenty MPs defected from the Finns Party's parliamentary group, forming what would eventually become the Blue Reform party. One MP (Kike Elomaa) later returned to the Finns Party and another (Kaj Turunen) defected to National Coalition Party, leaving the Blue Reform with 18 and Finns Party with 17 MPs. Veera Ruoho furthermore defected to the National Coalition. Sipilä's government retained a majority in the Parliament as the Blue Reform continued as a member of the coalition and the Finns Party was moved to the opposition.

On 8 March 2019, prime minister Sipilä resigned. However, that same day president Sauli Niinistö reappointed him as head of a caretaker government. According to Sipilä, his government collapsed because of the failure to reach agreement on the controversial health care reform. But several Finnish political analysts (Thomas Karv, Teivo Teivainen) interpreted his resignation as a strategic move that could give the coalition parties, Sipilä's Centre Party in particular, more freedom during the election campaign. Thus, the Centre Party might be able to revive itself in the polls, in which the party was lagging behind the Social Democrats.

Campaign
After the Oulu child sexual exploitation scandal, support for the anti-immigration Finns Party surged from around 8.5% to 9% in late 2018 to 17.5% by the election.

The Social Democrats proposed raising taxes to fund the country's welfare system.

The election saw "an unusual level of aggression on the campaign trail," especially considering "attacks on politicians are rare in Finland". In late March, a man struck Left Alliance candidate Suldaan Said Ahmed in the chest while calling him an infidel and pedophile a day after a man wearing logos of far-right anti-immigrant group Soldiers of Odin attempted to attack Foreign Minister Timo Soini of the Blue Party.

Electoral system
The 200 members of the Eduskunta were elected using proportional representation in 13 multi-member constituencies, with seats allocated according to the D'Hondt method. The number of elected representatives is proportional to the population in the district six months prior to the elections. Åland has single member electoral district and its own party system. Compared to the previous election in 2015, one seat was reallocated from Savonia-Karelia to Uusimaa.

Opinion polls

Results

Voter turnout was 72%, the highest since 1987. The highest turnout was in the Helsinki constituency, where the turnout was 78%. The lowest was in Savo-Karelia constituency at 67% and Åland constituency at 60%. Women had a slightly higher turnout of 74% compared for men who had a turnout of 71%.

Government formation
During election debates, the Social Democrats, the National Coalition Party, Green League, Left Alliance, and the Swedish People's Party stated that they were interested in joining a coalition that does not include the Finns Party. Despite being ruled-out by five parties, Finns Party chairman Jussi Halla-aho said that all parties should show responsibility when forming a coalition. He said the most responsible way to form a  coalition is to include the Finns Party.

Two weeks later, SDP chairman Antti Rinne, who was expected to lead the government, sent a questionnaire to each of the other parties, to assess their positions on various topics such as basic income, collective bargaining, climate change or health care reform. Based on the answers and initial talks with all parties, Rinne announced that he would negotiate forming a government with Centre Party, Green League, Left Alliance and Swedish People's Party. The negotiations were ultimately successful, and the Rinne Cabinet was formally inaugurated on 6 June.

References

Further reading
 
Special issue of Scandinavian Political Studies on the 2019 Finnish parliamentary election, Volume 42, Issue 3-4, 165-307, September‐December 2019

General elections in Finland
Finland
Parliamentary
Finland